Kannauj is a constituency of the Uttar Pradesh Legislative Assembly covering the city of Kannauj in the Kannauj district of Uttar Pradesh, India.

Kannauj is one of five assembly constituencies in the Kannauj Lok Sabha constituency. Since 2008, this assembly constituency is numbered 198 amongst 403 constituencies.

Currently this seat belongs to BJP candidate Asim Arun who won in last Assembly election of 2022 Uttar Pradesh Legislative Elections defeating Samajwadi Party candidate.

References

External links
 

Assembly constituencies of Uttar Pradesh
Kannauj